Roger Rager (September 3, 1948 – February 16, 2022) was an American racing driver in the USAC and CART Championship Car series.

Early life
Rager was born on September 3, 1948 in Lincoln, Nebraska. When he was four years old he ran a "space ship" go-kart around a track during an intermission for a race program that included his dad, Bob, at the Nebraska State Fair in Lincoln. At age 14, Rager purchased a stock car for $35 and raced at a local track. He later moved to Lincoln and raced on weekends. His first sprint win was at Jefferson County Speedway in Nebraska.

Career
Rager enjoyed numerous milestones as a sprint car racer in the early 1970s. He won many races all over the country and also was the United States captain for a sprint car team competing in South Africa in 1973. He returned to North America and moved to the Twin Cities in the mid-1970s. It was about that time that Rager also set a world record for the fastest lap on a one-mile dirt track, piloting a spring car without a wing. He also won the points championship at the famed Knoxville track. He would become the only driver to win at Knoxville in the 1960s, 1970s, 1980s, 1990s and 2000s.

Rager had many accomplishments as a sprint car racer, but he changed his race focus to the Indy Car series in the late 1970s. Rager started running some USAC events in 1976 and made his first Indy 500 qualifying attempt in 1977. His  qualifying run ended in a crash at 190 mph. Despite running on a small budget against some million dollar race teams, Rager just missed qualifying at the Brickyard by one spot in 1979. He did make the Indy 500 field in 1980 with the 10th fastest qualifying time.

"I had A. J. Foyt on the outside of my (fourth) row, so I thought I would follow him and he actually was slowing me down," Rager said of the legendary racer. Rager not only was leading Foyt, but the entire Indy 500 field for two laps.
Rager finished his Indy Car career with six top 10 finishes in 23 starts in USAC or CART events. He was also a USAC Rookie of the Year in 1980.

Rager's focus returned to sprint car racing in the mid-1980s when he was asked to drive for a guy at the speedway in Jackson, Minn. He also left the Twin Cities and purchased a resort on Loon Lake, just west of Pequot Lakes, in 1988. Rager's time in a sprint car started to dwindle as he focused much of his time on building up the resort. He eventually took time off from racing.

Shortly before turning 50, he received an offer to drive a sprint car at Cedar Lake Speedway in Wisconsin.
"I finally said I would drive one time, but I finished second in the heat and feature," he recalled. "I figured if it's still this easy, maybe I should start driving again." Rager continued racing for the next ten years and continued to enjoy success by winning an additional 30 features, including four at Knoxville Raceway. One of those races was a national qualifier in the 360 class. He also was a Masters Champion three times in six years at Knoxville. In 1990 Roger was inducted into Knoxville Hall of Fame.

Retirement and death
Roger retired after being inaugurated into the National Sprint Car Hall of Fame May 29, 2009. Living in Pequot Lakes, Minnesota, he owned Rager's Acres Seasonal RV Park on Loon Lake.

On June 22, 2011, Roger was inducted into the Big Car Racing Association (BCRA) Hall of Fame. He died on February 16, 2022, at the age of 73.

Awards and honors
United States Auto Club (USAC) Rookie of the Year, "Action Track" Driver of the Year, Captain of the United States Sprint Car Team in South Africa, Track Championship at Knoxville, IA and Minneapolis (North Star Speedway), Washington State Championship, NSS - National Champion 2000 and 2001, Knoxville, IA Masters Champion 2 out of 3 years, Knoxville Hall of Fame, Member of the elite "Leaders Circle Club", National Sprint Car Hall of Fame and BCRA Hall of Fame.

Racing record

Complete USAC Mini-Indy Series results

USAC Championship Car results
(key) (Races in bold indicate pole position)

CART results
(key) (Races in bold indicate pole position)

Indianapolis 500

References

Sources
 1980 Indy 500 stats
Roger Rager at ChampCarStats.com
 Nebraska Auto Racing Hall of Fame
 National Sprint Car Hall of Fame
Bill Carlson, MN 22:52, 7 October 2010 (UTC) added/edited content
 Rager's Acres Seasonal RV Park

1948 births
2022 deaths
Champ Car drivers
Indianapolis 500 drivers
National Sprint Car Hall of Fame inductees
Racing drivers from Nebraska
Sportspeople from Lincoln, Nebraska
USAC Silver Crown Series drivers